Turris perarata is an extinct species of sea snail, a marine gastropod mollusk in the family Turridae, the turrids.

Distribution
This extinct marine species was found in Eocene strata in Australia

References

 Cossmann (M.), 1896 - Essais de Paléoconchologie comparée (2ème livraison), p. 1-179 
 Tucker (J.K.), 1993 - The nomenclatural status of four species of Australian Turridae attributed to Ralph Tate by Maurice Cossmann in the Essais de Paléoconchologie Comparée of 1896. Journal of the Malacological Society of Australia, t. 14, p. 73-76

External links
  Tucker, J.K. 2004 Catalog of recent and fossil turrids (Mollusca: Gastropoda). Zootaxa 682:1-1295.

perarata
Gastropods described in 1896